Åshammar is a locality situated in Sandviken Municipality, Gävleborg County, Sweden with 699 inhabitants in 2018.

Amenities 
The town's school, Alsjöskolan, has approximately 100 pupils until the third grade. Adjacent to the school there is a nursery with 3 departments. Other amenities include a library, pizza and a supermarket.

Local businesses 
Åshammar is home to several small businesses, including a planing mill, window manufacturer and a carpentry. BUMAX AB, which produces fasteners, bolts and screws, is the largest employer in the town.

References 

Populated places in Sandviken Municipality
Gästrikland